Gibbons v. Ogden, 22 U.S. (9 Wheat.) 1 (1824), was a landmark decision of the Supreme Court of the United States which held that the power to regulate interstate commerce, which was granted to Congress by the Commerce Clause of the United States Constitution, encompassed the power to regulate navigation. The decision is credited with supporting the economic growth of the antebellum United States and the creation of national markets. Gibbons v. Ogden has since provided the basis for Congress' regulation of railroads, freeways and television and radio broadcasts.

The case was argued by some of America's most admired and capable attorneys at the time. The exiled Irish patriot Thomas Addis Emmet and Thomas J. Oakley argued for Ogden, and U.S. Attorney General William Wirt and Daniel Webster argued for Gibbons.

Background
In 1798 the New York State Legislature granted to Robert R. Livingston and Robert Fulton exclusive navigation privileges of all the waters within the jurisdiction of that state with boats moved by fire or steam for a term of twenty years. Livingston and Fulton subsequently also petitioned other states and territorial legislatures for similar monopolies in the hope of developing a national network of steamboat lines, but only the Orleans Territory accepted their petition and awarded them a monopoly on the lower Mississippi.

Aware of the potential of the new steamboat navigation, competitors challenged Livingston and Fulton by arguing that the commerce power of the federal government was exclusive and superseded state laws. Legal challenges followed, and in response, the monopoly attempted to undercut its rivals by selling them franchises or buying their boats. Former New Jersey Governor Aaron Ogden had tried to defy the monopoly but ultimately purchased a license from a Livingston and Fulton assignee in 1815 and entered business with Thomas Gibbons from Georgia. The partnership collapsed three years later, however, when Gibbons operated another steamboat on Ogden's route between Elizabeth-town, New Jersey (now Elizabeth), and New York City, which had been licensed by the United States Congress under a 1793 law regulating the coasting trade. The partners ended up in the New York Court for the Trial of Impeachments, which granted a permanent injunction against Gibbons in 1820.

Case
Aaron Ogden filed a complaint in the Court of Chancery of New York to ask the court to restrain Thomas Gibbons from operating on these waters. Ogden's lawyer contended that states often passed laws on issues regarding interstate matters and should have fully concurrent power with Congress on matters concerning interstate commerce.

Gibbons's lawyer, Daniel Webster, argued that Congress had exclusive national power over interstate commerce according to Article I, Section 8, Clause 3, of the Constitution and that to argue otherwise would result in confusing and contradictory local regulatory policies. The Court of Chancery of New York and the Court of Errors of New York found in favor of Ogden and issued an injunction to restrict Gibbons from operating his boats.

Gibbons appealed to the Supreme Court and argued, as he had in New York, that the monopoly conflicted with federal law. After several delays, the court began discussing the meaning of the commerce clause in 1824, which by that time had become an issue of wider interest. Congress was debating a bill to provide a federal survey of roads and canals.

Southerners, in particular, were growing more sensitive to what result a holding for exclusive federal jurisdiction over commerce would mean to them as sectional disputes, especially over slavery, were increasing. Just 18 months prior to oral arguments in the Gibbons v. Ogden case, the people of Charleston, South Carolina, had been dismayed at the revelation of Denmark Vesey's plotted slave revolt. The statehouse quickly followed up the preemptive suppression of the rebellion with the Negro Seamen Act, requiring free black sailors on ships coming into the state to be jailed for the duration of the ship's stay in port. The act was promptly struck down as unconstitutional by Associate Justice Johnson while he was riding federal circuit on grounds that the act violated commercial treaty provisions with Great Britain. South Carolina emphatically rejected Johnson's holding, and talk quickly emerged of nullification and violent disunion. To thread the needle in the Gibbons case, the Court would need to deliver a holding that both defended national power over interstate commerce but did not eradicate state police powers that Southern whites viewed as vital to their very survival.

Decision of Supreme Court
The US Supreme Court ruled in favor of Gibbons. Congress had the right to regulate interstate commerce. The sole decided source of Congress's power to promulgate the law at issue was the Commerce Clause. Accordingly, the Court had to answer whether the law regulated "commerce" that was "among the several states." With respect to "commerce," the Court held that commerce is more than mere traffic and is the trade of commodities. This broader definition includes navigation. The Court interpreted "among" as "intermingled with."

"If, as has always been understood, the sovereignty of Congress, though limited to specified objects, is plenary as to those objects, the power over commerce with foreign nations and among the several States is vested in Congress as absolutely as it would be in a single government, having in its Constitution the same restrictions on the exercise of the power as are found in the Constitution of the United States."

The part of the ruling which stated that any license granted under the Federal Coasting Act of 1793 takes precedence over any similar license granted by a state is also in the spirit of the Supremacy Clause although the Court did not specifically cite that clause.

The Court did not discuss the argument pressed for Gibbons by U.S. Attorney General Wirt that the federal patent laws preempted New York's patent grant to Fulton and Livingston. That question remained undecided for the next 140 years until the Supreme Court held in Sears, Roebuck & Co. v. Stiffel Co. (1964) that federal patent law preempted similar state laws.

Opinion excerpts

 The power to "regulate Commerce" is:

 In interpreting the power of Congress as to commerce "among the several states":

 Defining how far the power of Congress extends:

See also
List of United States Supreme Court cases, volume 22

References

Further reading

External links
 
 Gibbons v. Ogden, Law, and Society in the Early Republic
 
 Summary of Gibbons v. Ogden  

United States Constitution Article One case law
Legal history of New Jersey
1824 in United States case law
1824 in New Jersey
Port of New York and New Jersey
United States Supreme Court cases of the Marshall Court
United States Supreme Court cases